If You Love Your Children is a 2014 Canadian short film - depicting climate change, directed and produced by Sanjay Patel. The film has received many awards and nominations since its release in August 2014.

Plot
If You Love Your Children is a story of Raj, an engineer working in the energy industry who wants to write a book about climate change.  In his quest to get the book published, he loses everything - his job, his girl and his hope. But Raj finds his commitment to be stronger than his desires and in the end, he rises above his losses to realize his dream.

Awards

Festival selections

Urban Mediamakers Film Festivals, US
Accolade Global Film Competition, US
Filmi Toronto’s South Asian Film Festival, Canada
Indian Cine Film Festival-14, India
Best Shorts Competition, US
International Film Festival of Cinematic Arts, Los Angeles, US
Delhi international film festival, India
IndieFEST, US
International Film Festival for Documentary, Shorts & Comedy, Indonesia
South West London International Film Festival, UK
Borrego Springs Film Festival-2015, US
5th Jaipur International Film Festival (JIFF)-2015
Angkor Wat International Film Festival, Cambodia
Flickerfest 24th International Short Film Festival, Bondi Beach, Australia 
Hidden Gems Film Festival, Calgary, Canada
Rainier Independent Film Festival, US
 Edmonton International Film Festival

Red Hook International Film Festival, US
Jersey City International Television Film Festival, US
Big Soda Cinema Festival, US
International Independent Film Awards, US
ITSA Film Festival, US
Oregon Underground Film Festival, US
Yosemite Film Festival, US
International Film and Photography Festival - 2014, Indonesia
3rd Delhi Shorts International Film Festival, India
K.O Digital Solidarity International Film Festival, Spain
Environmental Film Festival - Washington, DC, USA.
 Flathead Lake International Cinemafest, US
 Access Code International Film Festival, India
 May Day Short Film Festival, US
 Pakistan International Mountain Film Festival, Pakistan
 Fort McMurray International Film Festival 
 2nd Pink City International Film Festival

External links

2014 films
2014 short films
Climate change films